Sir Richard Lambert (born 1944) is the former Director-General of the Confederation of British Industry.

Richard Lambert may also refer to:
Richard Cornthwaite Lambert (1868–1939), British Liberal MP
Richard S. Lambert (1894–1981), British writer and broadcaster
Richard Lambert (handballer) (born 1948), Canadian handball player
Rickie Lambert (born 1982), English footballer

See also
Richard Lambart (disambiguation)